François Vincent Marc de Beauvau, Prince de Beauvau-Craon (2 April 1676 - 10 March 1754), was a Lorrainese nobleman and viceroy of Tuscany.

History
Born in Nancy, the capital of the Duchy of Lorraine, he was the son of Louis, Marquis de Beauvau (1638–1703) and his second wife, Anne de Ligny.

On 16 December 1704 he married Anne Marguerite de Lignéville (1686–1772) at Lunéville. They had eight sons and 12 daughters. His wife Anne Marguerite was the mistress of his sovereign, Leopold, Duke of Lorraine. His sister, Catharine Diana de Beauveau, married the Irish Jacobite exile Owen O'Rourke.

Grand Duchy of Tuscany
He was governor of the regency council of the Grand Duchy of Tuscany for Grand Duke Francesco, later Francis I, Holy Roman Emperor, who had been declared successor of the last Medici ruler in the Treaty of Vienna. He administrated for this prince from 1737 to 1754, with the title of viceroy.

Titles
Having inherited the marquisate of Beauvau in Lorraine, he was created marquis de Craon on 21 August 1712 by Louis XIV of France.

On 13 November 1722 he became an honorary prince of the Holy Roman Empire under the title "Prince von Beauvau-Craon".

On 8 May 1727 he was made a grandee of Spain of the first class by Philip V, his son, Charles Juste, being admitted to the Honneurs de la Cour in Paris with the princely title in 1755.

Issue
The eight sons and 12 daughters are:
Élisabeth Charlotte de Beauvau (1705–1754), married Charles Ferdinand François de La Baume, Marquis de Saint-Martin, no issue. 
Anne Marguerite Gabrielle de Beauvau (1707–1792), married Jacques Henri of Lorraine, Prince de Mortagne(-sur-Gironde), no issue ; married Gaston Pierre Charles de Lévis, Duke de Mirepoix, no issue.
Gabrielle Françoise de Beauvau (1708–1758), married Gabriel Alexandre d'Alsace de Henin-Liétard, Prince de Chimay, no issue.
Marie Philippe Tècle de Beauvau (1709–1748), Canoness of Remiremont.
Nicolas Simon Jude de Beauvau (1710–1734), Abbé de Craon, never married.
Marie Françoise Catherine de Beauvau-Craon (1711–1787), married Louis François de Boufflers, Marquis d'Amestranges, no issue.
François Vincent Marc de Beauvau (1713–1742), Primat de Lorraine, never married.
Léopold Clément de Beauvau (1714–1723), knight of the Order of Malta.
Marie Louise Eugénie de Beauvau (1715–1734), Abbesss of Epinal.
Henriette Augustine de Beauvau (1716-?), nun in the Order of the Visitation of Holy Mary.
Charlotte Nicole de Beauvau (1717–1787), married Léopold Clément de Bassompierre, no issue.
Anne Marguerite de Beauvau (1719-?), nun in Paris.
Charles Juste de Beauvau (1720–1793), married Marie Sophie Charlotte de La Tour d'Auvergne daughter of Emmanuel Theodose de La Tour d'Auvergne, sovereign Duke of Bouillon and Louise Henriette Francoise de Lorraine and had issue; married Marie-Charlotte-Sylvie de Rohan, no issue.
Elisabeth de Beauvau (1722-?), Canoness in Poussy, then a nun in Paris.
Ferdinand Jerôme de Beauvau, Marquis de Haroué (1723–1790), married Louise Etienne Desmier d'Archiac and had issue.
Gabrielle Charlotte de Beauvau (1724–1790), Canoness in Remiremont, nun in Juvigny, last abbess of Saint-Antoine-des-Champs in Paris.
Alexandre Louis de Beauvau, Marquis de Craon (1725–1745), died at the Battle of Fontenoy.
Béatrix Alexis de Beauvau (1727–1730).
Hilarion François Louis de Beauvau (b. and d. 1728).
Antoine de Beauvau (1730–1736).

References

Princes of Beauvau-Craon
French politicians
Regents of Tuscany
Viceroys of Tuscany
1676 births
1754 deaths
Marc
Grandees of Spain
Marc
Marc
Knights of the Golden Fleece of Austria
Nobility from Nancy, France
18th century in the Grand Duchy of Tuscany
18th-century French people